Rougon, (pronounced Rue Gahn) is an unincorporated community in southeastern Pointe Coupee Parish, Louisiana United States. The area is home to several plantation houses.

History
The community was formerly home to the now defunct P. V. Rougon store built in 1881.

Geography
There are no officially designated boundaries to the village, but the area is more or less bounded by Louisiana Highway 414 on the northern edge of the area, LA-983 on the western edge, a set of railroad tracks on the eastern edge, and southern Pointe Coupee Parish border on the southern edge.  The zip code assigned to this area is 70773.

Major Roadways
 Louisiana Highway 983
 Louisiana Highway 416

Education
There is one school in the area, Rougon Elementary School (formerly Rougon High School).

References

External links
Rougon Boundary map

Unincorporated communities in Pointe Coupee Parish, Louisiana
Baton Rouge metropolitan area
Unincorporated communities in Louisiana